Stag is a British black comedy television serial created by Jim Field Smith and George Kay, starring Jim Howick, Stephen Campbell Moore, Pilou Asbæk, JJ Feild, Rufus Jones, Amit Shah, Reece Shearsmith, and Tim Key. The three-part series, directed by Jim Field Smith from his scripts co-written with George Kay, began broadcasting on BBC Two, in the United Kingdom, on 27 February 2016.

Plot
Eight men set off on a hunting trip in the Scottish Highlands, a stag party for "Johnners". Ian, the bride's brother, is a last-minute addition to the party after somebody else dropped out. Being less of an alpha male than the others, he is immediately singled out for ridicule, but remains with the group because he has promised his sister that he will look after her fiancé. After insulting the gamekeeper who best man "Ledge" has hired to take them hunting in the woods, the group is abandoned by the old man, leaving them to fend for themselves. After they set up camp, a mysterious figure begins killing them off one by one. The group soon find themselves running for their lives, all while speculating who the killer could be.

Cast
 Jim Howick as Ian
 Stephen Campbell Moore as Johnners
 JJ Feild as Ledge
 Rufus Jones as Cosmo
 Amit Shah as Mex
 Pilou Asbæk as Neils
 Reece Shearsmith as Wendy
 Tim Key as Aitken
 Christiaan Van Vuuren as Christoph
 James Cosmo as The Gamekeeper
 Sharon Rooney as Brodie
 Tom Davis as The Chef
 Amanda Abbington as Fran
 Ruta Gedmintas as Sophie

References

External links
 
 

2016 British television series debuts
2016 British television series endings
2010s British comedy television series
English-language television shows
2010s British television miniseries
BBC high definition shows
BBC television comedy
2010s British black comedy television series
Television shows set in Scotland